The O'Day 28 is an American sailboat, that was designed by C. Raymond Hunt Associates and first built in 1978.

Production
The design was built by O'Day Corp. (owned by Bangor Punta and later Lear Siegler) in the United States between 1978 and 1986, but it is now out of production. A total of 507 examples were completed.

Design

The O'Day 28 is a small recreational keelboat, built predominantly of fiberglass, with wood trim. It has a masthead sloop rig, a raked stem, a slightly reverse transom, an internally-mounted spade-type rudder controlled by a wheel and a fixed fin keel or centerboard. It displaces  and carries  of ballast. Starting with serial number 323, produced in 1980, the boats displace  and have a slightly shorter waterline length.

There was also a tall mast version, with a mast about  higher.

The boat is fitted with a Universal 12  diesel engine.

See also
List of sailing boat types

Similar sailboats
Alerion Express 28
Aloha 28
Beneteau First 285
Beneteau Oceanis 281
Bristol Channel Cutter
Cal 28
Catalina 28
Crown 28
Cumulus 28
Grampian 28
Hunter 28
Hunter 28.5
Hunter 280
J/28
Laser 28
Pearson 28
Sabre 28
Sea Sprite 27
Sirius 28
Tanzer 8.5
Tanzer 28
TES 28 Magnam
Viking 28

References

External links

Keelboats
1970s sailboat type designs
Sailing yachts
Sailboat type designs by C. Raymond Hunt Associates
Sailboat types built by O'Day Corp.